Dracomonticola is a genus of flowering plants in the orchid family, Orchidaceae. It contains only one known species, Dracomonticola virginea, native to Lesotho and South Africa.

See also
 List of Orchidaceae genera

References

External links
African Orchids, Dracomonticola virginea
Cameron & Rhoda McMaster's African Bulbs, South African Orchid Gallery, Dracomonticola virginea

Orchids of South Africa
Monotypic Orchidoideae genera
Orchideae genera
Orchideae